The Munabao Barmer Passenger is a passenger train of the Indian Railways, which runs between Barmer railway station of Barmer of  Rajasthan and Munabao railway station of Munabao, of Indian state Rajasthan.

Arrival and departure
Train no.54881 departs from Barmer, daily at 07:30, reaching Munabao the same day at 09:40.
Train no.54882 departs from Munabao daily at 10:30. from platform no.1 reaching Barmer the same day at 12:45.

Route and halts

The important halts of the train are :

 Barmer
 Jasai
 Bhachhbar
 Ramsar
 Gagariya
 Gadra Road
 Jaisinder
 Munabao

Average speed and frequency

The train runs with an average speed of 54 km/h and takes 2h 10m to cover 119 km. The train runs on daily basis.

Loco link
The train is hauled by Abu Road ABR WDM-3A Diesel engine.

See also

Barmer
Munabao
 Thar Link Express

References

Railway services introduced in 2014
Rail transport in Rajasthan
Transport in Barmer, Rajasthan
Slow and fast passenger trains in India